Dejan Majstorović (born April 22, 1988) is a Serbian professional basketball player who is currently ranked world No. 2 in men's individual 3x3 rankings by the International Basketball Federation (FIBA). He plays for Novi Sad Al-Wahda and Serbia men's national 3x3 team.

3x3 basketball career 
Majstorović started to play at the FIBA 3X3 World Tour in Jun 2013. He plays for United Arab Emirates based team Novi Sad Al-Wahda.

Serbia national team 
Majstorović represents Serbia in 3x3 basketball. He won two gold medals at the FIBA 3x3 World Championships, 2016 in China and 2017 in France and silver medal at the 2014 tournament in Russia. He was named MVP of the FIBA 3x3 World Cup 2017 and selected to the FIBA 3x3 World Cup 2017 Team of the Tournament.

Basketball career 
Majstorović played basketball for his hometown team Dunav in the Basketball League of Serbia B (2nd tier) during 2015–16 season.

Awards and accomplishments 
 FIBA 3x3 World Tour winner: 2 (2014, 2015)

Individual 
 FIBA 3x3 World Cup MVP Award: 2017, 2022
 FIBA 3x3 World Cup Team of the tournament: 2017, 2022
 FIBA 3x3 World Tour Shoot-Out Contest winner: 2014

References

External links
 
 Dejan Majstorović at Eurobasket
 Dejan Majstorović at redbull.com
 
 
 
 

1988 births
3x3 basketball players at the 2020 Summer Olympics
OKK Dunav players
KK Kotež Beko players
Living people
Olympic 3x3 basketball players of Serbia
People from Stara Pazova
Serbian men's 3x3 basketball players
Serbian men's basketball players
Basketball players at the 2015 European Games
European Games medalists in basketball
FIBA 3x3 World Tour players
Small forwards
Shooting guards
European Games bronze medalists for Serbia
European champions for Serbia
Medalists at the 2020 Summer Olympics
Olympic bronze medalists for Serbia
Olympic medalists in 3x3 basketball